Marie Curie: The Courage of Knowledge (French and German title: Marie Curie) is a 2016 internationally co-produced drama film directed by . It was screened in the Contemporary World Cinema section at the 2016 Toronto International Film Festival. It made its United States premiere at the New York Jewish Film Festival in 2017.

Plot
The film shows the life of Marie Curie from 1904 to 1911. Together with her husband Pierre Curie, she researches the isolation of the element radium, which they had discovered, and which leads to the first attempts to use radioactivity in cancer therapy. However, shortly after her second child is born, Pierre dies in a tragic accident with a horse wagon. Despite her great sadness, Curie continues her research and takes over her husband's lectures at the University of Paris. At the first Solvay conference, where she is the only woman, she meets Albert Einstein, who makes her laugh with his charm.

Returning to Paris, she runs for a place in the French Academy of Sciences, which until now has only consisted of men: those who still do not want to admit female members narrowly prevail in the election. She then begins an affair with her friend and scientist Paul Langevin; when his wife informs the press, Curie is publicly slandered. The Nobel Committee awards her the 1911 Nobel Prize in Chemistry, her second one after the Physics Prize in 1903. When they found out about the scandal, the Swedish ambassador tries to persuade her to voluntarily renounce, but she refuses and travels anyways to Stockholm to give the acceptance speech.

Cast
 Karolina Gruszka as Marie Curie, a physicist
 Arieh Worthalter as Paul Langevin, her collaborator and lover
 Charles Berling as Pierre Curie, Marie's husband and co-researcher
 Izabela Kuna as Bronia, Marie's sister
 Malik Zidi as André Debierne, a chemist
 Daniel Olbrychski as Emile Amagat, a physicist
 Marie Denarnaud as Jeanne Langevin, Paul's wife
 Piotr Głowacki as Albert Einstein, a physicist
 Jan Frycz as Ernest Solvay
  as August Gyldenstople
 Sasha Crapanzano as Irène Curie (9 years old)
 Rose Montron as Irène Curie (15 years old)
 Adele Schmitt as Ève Curie (7 years old)

Reception

Box office
Marie Curie: The Courage of Knowledge grossed $127,993 in the United States and Canada, and $1.8 million in other territories for a worldwide total of $1.9 million.

Critical response
On review aggregator Rotten Tomatoes, the film has an approval rating of 64%, based on 25 reviews, with an average rating of 5.30/10. The website's critics consensus reads, "Marie Curie: The Courage of Knowledge may test the patience of some viewers with its deliberate pacing, but this sensitively made biopic has its well-acted rewards". On Metacritic, the film has a weighted average score of 49 out of 100, based on 6 critics, indicating "mixed or average reviews".

References

External links
 
 

2016 films
2016 drama films
2016 biographical drama films
Polish drama films
French biographical drama films
2010s French-language films
Biographical films about scientists
Films about Marie Curie
Cultural depictions of Albert Einstein
Films set in the 1880s
Films set in the 1890s
Films shot in Poland
Films set in France
Films about Nobel laureates
Cultural depictions of Pierre Curie
2010s French films